Chris McQueer is a Scottish writer and spoken art performer. With extensive use of the Scots language, his writings are dark comedy and surreal humour. He is best known for his two published collections of short stories Hings and HWFG.

Background
McQueer was brought up in the East End of Glasgow. He worked in a sports shop and as a crime scene cleaner before becoming a full-time writer. He supports Celtic Football Club.

Writing career
He began his writing career by self-publishing short stories on Twitter. His first book collection, Hings, was published in 2017 and was compiled from his Twitter stories. It won Best Short Story Collection at the 2018 Saboteur Awards.

The success of Hings allowed McQueer to give up his job to write full time. It was followed by 2018's HWFG (which stands for Here We Fucking Go), and was McQueer's first collection of stories to be written specifically for book publication. After being dissatisfied with his initial efforts, which he felt too closely resembled the style of Hings, he consciously adopted a darker tone. He has subsequently begun work on his first novel. McQueer also gives regular spoken word performances of his stories.

In 2019, some of the stories from Hings were adapted as a three-part series of short films for BBC iPlayer, Chris McQueer's Hings. McQueer himself appears as the series' narrator.

Writing style
McQueer's work, which is written in naturalistic Glaswegian Scots and English, has a darkly humorous style that has been compared to that of Limmy and Irvine Welsh. Scottish actor Martin Compston described McQueer as "like Charlie Brooker on Buckfast".

References

External links

Living people
Writers from Glasgow
Scots-language writers
Scottish short story writers
Year of birth missing (living people)
21st-century Scottish writers